The Glasgow Cup is a football tournament open to teams from Glasgow, Scotland. Operated by the Glasgow Football Association, it was competed for annually by senior Glasgow clubs from 1887 until 1989. It is now (since the 2019–20 amended rules) competed for between the senior teams of Clyde, Partick Thistle and Queen's Park and the youth teams of Celtic and Rangers, and has used both knockout and round robin formats to determine the finalists.

The cup was dominated by the city's Old Firm rivals, Rangers and Celtic, who won the competition 44 times and 29 times respectively (including one shared win) while it was a senior competition. Only five times did the final not feature either Rangers or Celtic (1889, 1915, 1946, 1947, and 1989). The advent of European football led to the Glasgow Cup becoming less valued, and the tournament did not take place at all or was not finished several times in its later years. Since it was reinstated for youth teams, Rangers have won a further 13 editions, ahead of Celtic with 11 (following the 2019 final).

In season 2022-23 The Glasgow F.A. started a City of Glasgow Women’s Cup. Two teams contested the final at Excelsior Stadium, Airdrie. Rangers won the match 2-1 against Celtic

The Glasgow Cup should not be confused with the Scottish Youth Cup, which is open to youth sections of clubs across Scotland but has featured a Celtic v Rangers final nine times since its inception in 1983, often played within a few weeks of the Glasgow Cup final.

History 
 
The Glasgow Football Association Cup was once seen as an important competition, on a par with the League or the Scottish Cup. It was contested by the senior clubs in the Glasgow area, with the winners receiving a globular silver trophy. The competition was dominated by the old rivals of Celtic and Rangers, but the others, Clyde, Partick Thistle, Queen's Park and the now defunct Third Lanark all enjoyed relative success.

The competition's status diminished after World War II, with European competitions seeming more attractive and important, and the nationwide Scottish League Cup providing a new distraction for clubs and supporters and a rival for fixture dates. The competition was normally played early in the season, until 1960. After the demise of the similar Glasgow Merchants Charity Cup, the Glasgow Cup fixtures would be put in any available space with the final being played at the end of the season.

After 1971, the Glasgow Cup was not played until it was re-introduced for the 1974–75 season, but it was generally seen as unappealing, and was even left incomplete on occasion; otherwise the final was often held over until the beginning of the following season. In the event of a Celtic v Rangers final, both would still usually put out full-strength first teams. This remained the case up to 1986 when a crowd of over 40,000 saw Rangers take the trophy with a 3–2 win over Scottish champions Celtic, courtesy of an Ally McCoist hat-trick, to give manager Graeme Souness his first trophy days after taking charge. After that, it essentially became a reserve team tournament. Rangers retained the trophy the following season in another old rivals final; only 15,000 were there to watch what were effectively two reserve teams. The following season's contest was never completed. Officially there were no suitable dates available to fit in ties; in reality, the competition had become irrelevant. In 1988 the competition was abandoned, and the final edition was played out in 1989 with Partick Thistle becoming the final winners of the competition in its original format.

The Glasgow Cup was subsequently relaunched in 1990 as an Under-19 tournament competed for by the youth teams of Celtic, Clyde, Partick Thistle, Queen's Park and Rangers. It then became an Under-17 tournament in 2008, competed for by the same teams as previously (although Clyde, once based in Rutherglen on the city boundary, had since relocated to Cumbernauld some distance outside Glasgow).

From the 2019 competition, the age limit was raised to Under-20, with several players involved in the Celtic v Rangers final that year having already featured for the clubs' senior teams in domestic and European competitions; the match itself, played at Celtic Park, did not involve any public ticket sales due to concerns regarding spectator disorder as had occurred in previous years.

The format was changed again for 2019–20, with the Old Firm clubs now fielding under-21s plus two overage players, and the other three clubs using their first teams with two trialists, in a home-and-away league basis followed by a final between the top two. In the opening round of fixtures, Clyde's 50-year-old manager Danny Lennon drew attention in the media when he brought himself on as a substitute in a win over Celtic's 'colts'. That edition was delayed then eventually cancelled due to the COVID-19 pandemic in Scotland, with no competition in 2020–21 and a shorter version (one round of fixtures rather than two) in 2021–22.

Finals 

Key

Performance by club

Senior competition
(118 finals played including one walkover win and one shared title)

Notes

Women's football
The first edition of the City of Glasgow Women's Cup was played in July 2022.

See also
East of Scotland Shield

References

External links 
 Glasgow Cup at Scottish Football Historical Archive
 Glasgow Cup 1887–1988 at RSSSF
 Celtic Glasgow Cup results (til 1989), FitbaStats
 Clyde Glasgow Cup results (til 1989), FitbaStats
 Partick Thistle Glasgow Cup results (til 1989), FitbaStats
 Queen's Park Glasgow Cup results (til 1989), QPFC.com
 Rangers Glasgow Cup results (til 1989), FitbaStats
 Third Lanark Glasgow Cup results (til 1967), FitbaStats

Football cup competitions in Scotland
Football in Glasgow
1887 establishments in Scotland
Recurring sporting events established in 1887
Youth football in Scotland
Youth football competitions
Annual sporting events in the United Kingdom